is a Japanese video game software developer located in Tokyo, Japan. Originally established as “GEN CREATIVE HOUSE CO., LTD.” in February 1987, changed company name to “G-Artists Inc.” in March 1991, then to “epics Inc.” in June 2006.

Release history

Popolocrois 

 is a manga series by Yohsuke Tamori, originally published in the Asahi Student Newspaper (a subsidiary of the Asahi Shimbun newspaper). It was later adapted into five role-playing video games and two anime series. Its title, pronounced (PO-po-lo-croyce), is a combination of words from two languages: the Italian word "Popolo (people)" and the French "croisé (crossing)", which together mean "crossing of people". The general theme of the series is love and compassion, that the race to which one belongs isn't important and the importance of friendship. Five PoPoLoCRoIS games, the original PlayStation release along with its four sequels, were previously released only in Japan. The PSP release is the first PoPoLoCRoIS game to be released in the USA and Europe. In 2015, a crossover with the Story of Seasons series of games was released, which will also be brought to the USA by XSeed.

While random and turn-based, battles take on a form very similar to console strategy RPGs (such as Final Fantasy Tactics). When a character's turn begins, they can move along a small grid and attack enemies from four cardinal directions, each with their own advantages and disadvantages. For example, an attack to the enemy's back will deal more damage, as will skipping a turn to focus on the next turn.

The main character is the prince of the Popolocrois kingdom, Pietro. The first game, PoPoLoCRoIS Monogatari, starts on the night of Pietro's 10th birthday, when he learns that his mother, who he thought was long dead, was found in a coma. Pietro sets out into a journey along with the apprentice forest witch Narcia to save his mother's soul from the underworld.

Development and history
 November 1978 - Popolocrois is first published in the women's magazine Pafu ぱふ (pafu?)
 October 1984 - The cartoon is published Asahi Shimbun Student Newspaper, which is considered the official start of the PoPoLoCrois series.
 1994 - The Popolocrois animated theatrical pilot is released.
 July 12, 1996 - Sony Computer Entertainment (SCE) releases the Popolocrois Story role-playing video game for the Sony PlayStation.
 October 4, 1998 - March 28, 1999 - The Popolocrois anime television series is broadcast on TV Tokyo.
 November 26, 1998 - SCE releases Poporogue, the second PoPoLoCrois game, on PlayStation.
 January 27, 2000 - SCE releases Popolocrois Story II on PlayStation.
 June 20, 2002 - SCE releases Popolocrois: Adventure of Beginnings the for PlayStation 2.
 October 5, 2003 to March 28, 2004, TV Tokyo broadcasts a second PoPoLoCrois anime series.
 March 18, 2004 - SCE releases'Popolocrois: Adventure of the Law of the Moon on PlayStation 2.
 February 10, 2005 - SCE releases PoPoLoCrois for the PlayStation Portable, which contains heavily edited versions of the stories from PopoloCrois Story I andII, as well as some new material.
 May 19, 2005 - the PSP PoPoLoCrois becomes the first game of the series to be released outside of Japan, launching first in Hong Kong and Taiwan. It was released later that year in North America (December 6, 2005) through Agetec. Prince Pietros version is later released in Europe June 16, 2006 through Ignition Entertainment, and in North America and Australia June 30, 2006.
 December 10, 2013 - Yohsuke Tamori & Atsuko Fukushima team up to create spin-offs Popolocrois novel called Maya Mensis Aureos that was published by Kaiseisha; it is ended as a trilogy.
 February 18, 2015 - SCE releases the Popolocrois Prequel novel PoPoLoCHRONICLE. It takes place before the events of the first game.
 June 18, 2015 - SCE and Marvelous develop the crossover title  Popolocrois Bokujou Monogatari for the Nintendo 3DS. It was released in North America (March 1, 2016) and Europe by XSEEDS and Marvelous.

Gameplay
While random and turn-based, battles take on a form very similar to console strategy RPGs (such as Final Fantasy Tactics). When a character's turn begins, they can move along a small grid and attack enemies from four cardinal directions, each with their own advantages and disadvantages. For example, an attack to the enemy's back will deal more damage, as will skipping a turn to focus on the next turn.

The gameplay has been criticised for having semi-tedious load times (especially on the Sony PSP). On the Sony PSP, the sprites may lag for a while in some areas. It has also been criticised for having very frequent random encounters which, coupled with the battle system, can really slow down a simple walk from one town to another.

Characters
 Pietro is very caring and values friendship, and he gets more courageous as the game progresses. Pietro has a crush on Narcia ever since they had their first adventure together. Pietro finds out that he is part dragon because his mother Queen Sania is a dragon.
 Narcia is an apprentice forest witch who helps Pietro in the game. Narcia wears a pink dress with a two pointed hat for a specific purpose; when she is 15 years old, she begins to wear a semi purple and pink dress.
 Kai is Narcia's shapeshifting alter ego. Guilda gave her the treasure of the forest witches: the Golden Key which allowed her to become a human so she wouldn't turn into bubbles if she came in contact with seawater; but if anyone discovered this secret, she would fall into a coma. At first she tricks Pietro and the White Knight into thinking that she's a friend of Narcia's, but she reveals her secret to Pietro by accident and later Kimendoji.
 White Knight is first met by Pietro and Narcia at the same time Naguro is met. He joins the party and stays until the very end of book one, Ice Demon. He then rejoins the party when Pietro, Don and Gon go the mine in Pasela to find a dragon in there, but leaves after a baby dragon imprints on him. He stays behind in the land of dragons to help the baby get used to living there.
 GamiGami Devil is a slightly unbalanced dwarf who, though unable to read or write above the level of a child, is a technical genius who creates robots and vast cities.
 Ice Demon is the ruler of North Land and master of ice magic. In the past, he attacked Popolocrois, but was stopped and defeated by a dragon.

Story
The main character is the prince of the Popolocrois kingdom, Pietro. The first game, Popolocrois Monogatari, starts at the night of Pietro's 10th birthday, when he learns that his mother, who he thought was long dead, was found in a coma. Pietro sets out into a journey along with the apprentice forest witch Narcia to save his mother's soul from the underworld.

There are two more games continuing the tales of Pietro and company. The second game, PoPoRoGue (portmanteau of PoPoLoCRoIS + Epilogue), features Pietro as a 12-year-old boy that went off to save his father from the dream world that he was forced into. The third, PoPoLoCRoIS Monogatari II, features Pietro and Narcia as 15-year-olds with different costumes, who went off the defeat the mysterious force that was going to destroy the world. PoPoLoCRoIS Monogatari II was the most famous game of the series, due to the darkened story, new party members, and many other features. The PSP release is a reproduction of PoPoLoCRoIS Monogatari (included into Book 1) and PoPoLoCRoIS Monogatari II (included into Book 3), with Book 2 being a brand-new scenario.

 Ape Escape Racing Ape Escape Racing' (サルゲッチュ ピポサルレーサー   Saru Get You: Pipo Saru Racer) is a racing game featuring the monkeys from the Ape Escape series. It was released in Japan on December 7, 2006. 11 months after its first release, the game was added into the 'PSP The Best' series'. In Ape Escape Racing the player 'builds' their monkey into a racing machine, by giving him an engine and tires. The game features 47 vehicles, each in two forms: one specialized in drifting, one specialized in acceleration. Other vehicles are unlocked as the player proceeds through the ranks. The main game consists four racing tracks in a grand prix. Each improved race time will fill a monkey bar at the top of the grand prix menu. Once this bar is filled, a VS mode is unlocked where the tracks will be played again but an evil, much faster monkey is involved in the races. If the player achieves a top overall position, they will 'rank up' and unlock another four tracks and so on. Levels that have been unlocked can be replayed in normal race form or in a time trial form. Each of the tracks are set in the same arena, but the path changes to a harder one as more are unlocked. The tracks are set in the following order: The Beach, The City, The Graveyard and The Jungle. The game uses the PlayStation Portable's wireless capabilities for game sharing and ad-hoc wireless LAN multiplayer races.

 Nanashi no Game 

 is a first-person survival horror video game developed by Epics and published by Square Enix for the Nintendo DS. The game follows a university student who becomes cursed by the titular role-playing game, which causes people to die in seven days upon starting. It was released on July 3, 2008, in Japan. A sequel, titled Nanashi no Game: Me, was later released on August 27, 2009 in Japan.

Most of the game takes place in the real world, where the player navigates real-time 3D environments using the DS's D-Pad and Touch Screen. While exploring, the player must solve puzzles and reach locations. The player can switch to the TS Menu at any time, where they can play the cursed game, read e-mail messages, and load a previous save file. In many cases, an e-mail message or update to the cursed game will interrupt the player's exploration. In the cursed game, which only uses the top DS screen, the player controls a 2D 8-bit RPG that provides clues to the current situations and can, in some cases, advance the story. The player encounters , zombie-like spirits that roam the area in exploration mode and end the game upon touching the player.

As of September 30, 2008, Nanashi no Game has sold 60,000 copies in Japan. Famitsu rated the game 30/40.

Epics developed a sequel, a survival horror video game for the Nintendo DS. It was published by Square Enix, and released on August 27, 2009 in Japan. The story follows an anthropology student from Nanto University, as he discovers two cursed games, an RPG and a platformer. The game's title refers to the protagonist's left eye, represented by the left screen of the DS when held sideways, which allows the player to see things left (and hidden) by the curse. It sold 15,000 copies on the week of its release.

Much like in the original, Nanashi no Game: Me involves two separate modes of play. Most of the game takes place in the real world, where the player navigates real-time 3D environments using the DS's D-Pad and Touch Screen. While exploring, the player must solve puzzles and reach locations. The player can switch to the TS Menu at any time, where they can play the cursed game, read e-mail messages, and load a previous save file. In many cases, an e-mail message or update to the cursed game will interrupt the player's exploration. In the cursed game, which only uses the top DS screen, the player controls a 2D 8-bit RPG that provides clues to the current situations and can, in some cases, advance the story. In Nanashi no Game: Me'', the player can now choose the locations they want to explore out of the two available for each day (for three days only). Each destination provides different experiences, including the Regrets the player will encounter.

Two spin-off DSiWare titles, named  and  respectively, have also been released on 9 September 2009. Another sequel, was released on 26 January 2012 for iOS, and in February 2012 for Android.

References

External links
 

Video game development companies
Video game companies established in 1987
Video game companies of Japan
Japanese companies established in 1987